Majuwa is a village in Sankhar VDC, Ward No. 6,  Syangja District, Gandaki Zone, Nepal. At the time of the Nepal Census 2011, it had a population of 551 people residing in 146 individual households. Dihi, Ambote, Devithan such are sub-localities of this village.

References

Populated places in Syangja District